Arrieta can refer to:

Places
 Arrieta, municipality in the province of Biscay, Basque Country
 Arrieta, Lanzarote, seaside village in the north of Lanzarote, Canary Islands

People
Agustín Arrieta (1803-1874), Mexican painter
Cristian Arrieta (born 1979), U.S. American footballer
Danilo Arrieta (born 1987), Danish footballer
Domingo Arrieta León (1874-1962), Mexican general and statesman
Emilio Arrieta (1823-1894), Spanish composer
Jairo Arrieta (born 1983), Costa Rican footballer
Jake Arrieta (born 1986), Major League Baseball pitcher 
Johana Arrieta (born 1998), Colombian track athlete
Joxe Austin Arrieta (born 1949), Spanish Basque writer and translator
Jose Luis Arrieta (born 1971), Spanish cyclist
Luis Arrieta (born 1982), Mexican actor and filmmaker
Maribel Arrieta (1934-1989), Salvadoran beauty queen, diplomat and artist
Raymond Arrieta (born 1965), Puerto Rican entertainer and philanthropist
Santiago Arrieta (1897–1975), Uruguayan actor
Yolanda Arrieta (born 1963), Spanish Basque writer

See also
Arietta (disambiguation)

Basque-language surnames